Haptenchelys is a genus of deep-water eel in the family Synaphobranchidae. It contains two species.

Species
There are currently 2 recognized species in this genus:
 Haptenchelys parviocularis Tashiro & Shinohara, 2014 (Small-eyed abyssal eel) 
 Haptenchelys texis C. H. Robins & D. M. Martin, 1976

References

Synaphobranchidae